Stanstead was an electoral district of the Legislative Assembly of the Parliament of the Province of Canada, in Canada East.  It was south-east of Montreal, in the Eastern Townships. Created in 1841, it was based on the previous electoral district of the same name for the Legislative Assembly of Lower Canada. 

Stanstead was represented by one member in the Legislative Assembly.  It was abolished in 1867, upon the creation of Canada and the province of Quebec.

Boundaries 

Stanstead electoral district was located In the Eastern Townships, south of Montreal (including areas now in Memphrémagog Regional County Municipality and Coaticook Regional County Municipality).  The district extended south to the border with the United States.

The Union Act, 1840 merged the two provinces of Upper Canada and Lower Canada into the Province of Canada, with a single Parliament.  The separate parliaments of Lower Canada and Upper Canada were abolished.Union Act, 1840, 3 & 4 Vict., c. 35, s. 2.  The Union Act provided that the pre-existing electoral boundaries of Lower Canada and Upper Canada would continue to be used in the new Parliament, unless altered by the Union Act itself.

The Lower Canada electoral district of Stanstead was not altered by the Union Act and therefore continued with the same boundaries in the new Parliament. Those boundaries had been set by a statute of Lower Canada in 1829:

Members of the Legislative Assembly 

Stanstead was represented by one member in the Legislative Assembly. The following were the members for Stanstead.

Abolition 

The district was abolished on July 1, 1867, when the British North America Act, 1867 came into force, creating Canada and splitting the Province of Canada into Quebec and Ontario.  It was succeeded by electoral districts of the same name in the House of Commons of Canada and the Legislative Assembly of Quebec.

References 

Electoral districts of Canada East